Joshua Langford (born January 15, 1997) is an American former basketball player. He played college basketball for the Michigan State Spartans. A native of Huntsville, Alabama, he competed for Madison Academy at the high school level.

Early life and high school career
Langford is the son of Tellus Langford. When he was 12 years old attending a football camp, Josh fell ill and began experiencing headaches, a spiking fever, and hallucinations. He was diagnosed with bacterial meningitis and nearly died, spending a week in the hospital. But when he recovered, he grew three inches and returned to playing basketball. At Madison Academy, Langford was a four-time Class 3A Player of the Year, a two-time Gatorade Alabama Player of the Year and a two-time state champion. He also taught Sunday School, volunteered for the Special Olympics and wrote poetry in his free time.

College career
Langford was a five-star recruit and was ranked as the 17th-best player of his class by Rivals.com. He declined offers from schools such as Michigan, Kentucky, Kansas, Arizona and Duke. He announced that he would play for Michigan State on June 22, 2015, citing the "family atmosphere" as the reason he chose the Spartans.

Langford had 17 points, a career high, in a win against Nebraska in February 2017. In the First Round of the NCAA Tournament Langford contributed 13 as the Spartans blew out the Miami Hurricanes 78–58 to advance to the Second Round. Langford scored in double figures eight times as a freshman. He favored the mid-range shot, which is on the decline in basketball. In one game versus Notre Dame in November 2017, he had 17 points by utilizing his mid-range game. In another November game, Langford had the big offensive game for the Spartans, scoring a career-high 23 points as the Spartans defeated North Carolina. Josh Langford scored 23 points to lead the Spartans to an easy win over Cleveland State on December 28. Langford added 22 points in the NCAA Tournament win over Bucknell.

Langford was limited to 13 games as a junior due to a foot injury. On December 19, it was announced that Langford would miss the entire 2019–20 season after undergoing foot surgery. He still has an extra season of eligibility.
On November 25, 2020, Langford returned to the court for the Spartans for the first time since December of 2018 in Michigan State's 2020 season opener against Eastern Michigan, scoring 10 points in the 83-67 victory.

Career statistics

College

|-
| style="text-align:left;"| 2016–17
| style="text-align:left;"| Michigan State
| 35 || 27 || 21.0 || .497 || .416 || .654 || 2.3 || 1.1 || .4 || .1 || 6.9
|-
| style="text-align:left;"| 2017–18
| style="text-align:left;"| Michigan State
| 35 || 35 || 27.0 || .429 || .404 || .849 || 3.0 || 1.5 || .4 || .1 || 11.7
|-
| style="text-align:left;"| 2018–19
| style="text-align:left;"| Michigan State
| 13 || 13 || 28.0 || .443 || .403 || .839 || 3.6 || 1.8 || .8 || .1 || 15.0
|-
| style="text-align:left;"| 2020–21
| style="text-align:left;"| Michigan State
| 27 || 26 || 28.6 || .377 || .343 || .745 || 3.6 || 2.3 || .6 || .3 || 9.7
|- class="sortbottom"
| style="text-align:center;" colspan="2"| Career
| 110 || 101 || 25.5 || .431 || .390 || .789 || 3.0 || 1.5 || .5 || .1 || 10.1

References

External links
Michigan State Spartans bio
USA Basketball bio

1997 births
Living people
American men's basketball players
Basketball players from Alabama
McDonald's High School All-Americans
Michigan State Spartans men's basketball players
Shooting guards
Sportspeople from Huntsville, Alabama